Lindisfarne National Nature Reserve is a  UK national nature reserve. It was founded to help safeguard the internationally important wintering bird populations, and six internationally important species of wildfowl and wading birds winter here. For the pale-bellied brent geese from Svalbard, this is their only regular wintering place in all of the United Kingdom. Pinkfooted and greylag geese, wigeons, grey plovers and bar-tailed godwits are the other visitors.

Ramsar Site
Lindisfarne National Nature Reserve is a Ramsar site, and as a result is a wetland of international significance.

Habitats

Lindisfarne National Nature Reserve protects a stretch of coastline, including the dunes of Lindisfarne (Holy Island).  Lindisfarne NNR has international recognition and covers a large and varied mosaic of internationally recognised and important coastal habitats. These include intertidal mudflats, rocky shore, sand dunes and salt marshes. The dunes of the Lindisfarne National Nature Reserve support many plants. Early forget-me-nots and marram grass are among those that hug the ground and need little water. Many species of insects, moths, and butterflies appreciate this environment, including the 'woolly bears' (tiger moth caterpillars). Dark green fritillary, and grayling butterflies bask in the sun during July and August in the Lindisfarne NNR. Big brown-lipped snails can also be found. During early summer, the purple northern marsh orchid flourishes along with its pinker relation, the early marsh orchid. In July the marsh helleborines flower by the thousands and form spectacular white carpets.  Recently a unique orchid, the Lindisfarne helleborine, has been discovered on the island. The plants were formerly identified as dune helleborine (Epipactis dunensis), but DNA analysis carried out in 2003 revealed them to be genetically distinct, and the new species was given the scientific name Epipactis sancta.

Birds

Bird species for which the Lindisfarne National Nature Reserve is important include pale-bellied brent goose, wigeon, teal, pintail, merlin, dunlin, bar-tailed godwit and many others. The situation on the east coast also makes it a good place for observing migrating birds arriving from the east, including large numbers of redwing and fieldfare, and also scarcer Siberian birds including regular annual yellow-browed warblers. Rare species such as Radde's warbler, dusky warbler and red-flanked bluetail have all occurred on Lindisfarne. , 330 species have been recorded on the isle of Lindisfarne and the adjacent Lindisfarne National Nature Reserve. The large number and variety of birds present makes the area a very popular region with bird watchers, particularly in the autumn and winter.

Common throughout Lindisfarne and the Farne Islands are the common eider duck.  Saint Cuthbert was reputed to be very fond of them (as pets, not food) during his periods on the Farnes as a hermit.  In 676 he promulgated a law protecting the birds, reputed to be the first bird protection legislation.  Locally the birds are known as "Cuddy's ducks" (occasionally "Cuddy's hens") after the familiar form of "Cuthbert".

Seals
Grey seals are commonly found in the waters and on the rocks around the isle of Lindisfarne, and common seals are also occasionally seen.

Location
Lindisfarne National Nature Reserve is located on the North Northumberland coastline. Lindisfarne is sign-posted from the A1 highway south of Berwick-upon-Tweed. There are car parks available on the isle of Lindisfarne (Holy Island), at Budle Bay, and at Beal, on the mainland of England.

The causeway and safety

Access to the island is by a tidal causeway.  Visitors to the island must check tide times and weather carefully, and seek local advice if in doubt.  The road is generally open from about 3 hours after high tide until 2 hours before the next high tide, but the period of closure may be extended during stormy weather.  Walkers using the causeway over the mud flats are advised that the safe time is shorter.  Despite these warnings, about one vehicle each month is stranded on the causeway.  Tide tables giving the safe crossing periods are published by Northumberland County council.

Volunteering opportunities

The Lindisfarne National Nature Reserve offers a range of volunteering opportunities for youths, seniors, and families. These volunteer opportunities include: Species Recording, Habitat and Estate Management, Site Wardening, and acting as guides during guided walks.

References

National nature reserves in England
Ramsar sites in England
Northumberland coast
Sites of Special Scientific Interest in Northumberland
Nature reserves in Northumberland
Lindisfarne